Lake Holiday is a  artificial lake located northwest of Winchester in Frederick County, Virginia, United States. The lake flows into Isaacs Creek, an east-flowing tributary of Back Creek, which flows north through West Virginia to the Potomac River. The main creeks feeding the lake are Isaacs Creek and Yeiders Run/Miller Run.

Residential development surrounds the lake and forms the Lake Holiday census-designated place (CDP), with a population at the 2010 census of 1,905. It is an unincorporated community subject to a property owners association.

Lake Holiday is approximately one mile southeast of the boundary with the western border of Hampshire County, West Virginia.

Description

Construction on the dam that forms the lake began in the late 1960s and was finished early in 1972. According to history from the original builders of Lake Holiday, it took nearly 12 years for the lake to fill to capacity. Scuba diving is deemed unsafe and not allowed.

A new spillway has been installed on the existing dam. The spillway was required by the US Army Corps of Engineers due to changing standards and post 11 September 2001 incidents. The construction consisted of the building of a new bridge and a redesign of the downstream creek bed. The spillway project was completed in June 2013 with a grand reopening of South Lakeview Drive (spillway road) on Memorial Day. The improvement cost the residents of the lake community over $10.5 million.

Lake Holiday has a private marina available for use by members. There are also tennis and basketball courts located near the club house.

References

External links
Lake Holiday Country Club and Property Owners Association

Chesapeake Bay watershed
Census-designated places in Frederick County, Virginia
Census-designated places in Virginia